Tobias Cohn or Tobias Kohn (in Hebrew, Toviyyah ben Moshe ha-Kohen, Tuvia Harofeh - Tuvia the doctor; in Polish, Tobiasz Kohn) (also referred to as Toviyah Kats) (1652-1729) was a Polish-Jewish physician of the seventeenth and eighteenth centuries. He was born at Metz in 1652.

Biography
Cohn's grandfather was the physician Eleazar Kohn, who emigrated from the Holy Land to Poland, and settled in Kamenetz-Podolsk, where he practised medicine until his death. His father was the Polish rabbi and physician Moses Kohn of Narol, in the district of Bielsk, who moved to Metz in 1648 to escape persecution during the Chmielnicki Uprising and became rabbi there. Tobias and his elder brother returned to Poland after the death of their father in 1673. He received his education at Kraków and the universities of Frankfort-on-the-Oder (at the expense of the great elector of Brandenburg) and Padua, graduating from the latter as doctor of medicine. He practised for some time in Poland, and moved later to Adrianople, where he became physician to five successive Ottoman sultans— Mehmed IV, Suleiman II, Ahmed II, Mustafa II, and Ahmed III, moving with the court to Constantinople. In 1724 he went to Jerusalem, where he lived until his death in 1729.

Writings

Cohn was familiar with ten languages - Hebrew, German, Polish, Italian, French, Spanish, Turkish, Latin, Greek, and Arabic. This great linguistic knowledge made it possible for him to write his Ma'aseh Toviyyah (Work of Tobias), published in Venice, Italy in 1707, and reprinted there in 1715, 1728, 1769, and 1850. The work is encyclopedic, and is divided into eight parts: (1) theology; (2) astronomy; (3) medicine; (4) hygiene; (5) syphilitic maladies; (6) botany; (7) cosmography; and (8) an essay on the four elements.

The most important is the third part, which contains an illustration showing a human body and a house side by side and comparing the members of the former to the parts of the latter (see illustration).

In part 2 are found an astrolabe and illustrations of astronomical and mathematical instruments. Inserted between parts 6 and 7 is Turkish-Latin-Spanish dictionary; and prefixed to the work is a poem by Solomon Conegliano.

Cohn's medical knowledge and experiences seem to have been of considerable importance. He gave, from his own observations, the first description of the "plica polonica," as well as many local symptoms and newly discovered medicinal herbs. He also published in three languages a list of remedies.

He criticized the anti-Semitic professors of Frankfort-on-the-Oder as well as his coreligionists who were devoted to Kabbalah and committed to a blind belief in miracles.

References
Hirsch, Biog. Lex. s.v.;
Rev. Et-Juives, xvii. 293; xxi. 140, 318;
M. Bersohn, Tobiasz Kohn, Warsaw, 1872.

External links

 Illustration at "Dream Anatomy", National Library of Medicine

1652 births
1729 deaths
17th-century Polish physicians
18th-century Polish–Lithuanian physicians
17th-century physicians from the Ottoman Empire
18th-century physicians from the Ottoman Empire
17th-century Polish Jews
Ashkenazi Jews in Ottoman Palestine
Ashkenazi Jews from the Ottoman Empire
Levites
Polish medical writers
17th-century Jewish physicians
18th-century Jewish physicians
Scientists from the Ottoman Empire
Physicians from Metz